Martin Leonard Hindorff (March 30, 1897 – March 5, 1969) was a Swedish sailor who competed in the 1932 Summer Olympics, in the 1936 Summer Olympics,  in the 1948 Summer Olympics, and  in the 1952 Summer Olympics. He was born in Nyköping and died in Stockholm.

In 1932 he was a crew member of the Swedish boat Bissbi, which won the gold medal in the 6 metre class.

Four years later he won the bronze medal as crew member of the Swedish boat May Be in the 6 metre class.

In 1948 he won his second bronze medal. This time as crew member of the Swedish boat Ali Baba II in the 6 metre class.

He finished his Olympic career in 1952 when he finished fourth as a crew member of the Swedish boat May Be II in the 6 metre class event.

External links
profile

1897 births
1969 deaths
Swedish male sailors (sport)
Olympic sailors of Sweden
Sailors at the 1932 Summer Olympics – 6 Metre
Sailors at the 1936 Summer Olympics – 6 Metre
Sailors at the 1948 Summer Olympics – 6 Metre
Sailors at the 1952 Summer Olympics – 6 Metre
Olympic gold medalists for Sweden
Olympic bronze medalists for Sweden
Olympic medalists in sailing
Royal Swedish Yacht Club sailors

Medalists at the 1948 Summer Olympics
Medalists at the 1936 Summer Olympics
Medalists at the 1932 Summer Olympics
20th-century Swedish people